Tseung Kong Wai aka. Lo Wai, formerly Sai Tau Lei, is a walled village in Ha Tsuen, Yuen Long District, Hong Kong.

Administration
Tseung Kong Wai is a recognized village under the New Territories Small House Policy.

History
During the Hungwu reign of the Ming Dynasty, two members of Tang clans in Kam Tin left for Ha Tsuen as they saw the potentials of this place as markets and places of producing fish and salt.
These two members of Tang clans, Tang Hung Wai and Tang Hung Chih, built two villages there. The two villages are Tseung Kong Wai (formerly Sai Tau Lei) and Tung Tau Tsuen (formerly Tung Tau Lei).

See also
 Walled villages of Hong Kong

References

External links
 Delineation of area of existing village Tseung Kong Wai (Pha Tsuen) for election of resident representative (2019 to 2022)
 Webpage about Tseung Kong Wai

Walled villages of Hong Kong
Ha Tsuen
Villages in Yuen Long District, Hong Kong